Baeckea grandibracteata is a species of flowering plant in the family Myrtaceae and is endemic to central Western Australia. Found on undulating sand-plains in the eastern Wheatbelt region of Western Australia in the area around Yilgarn, it grows in sandy and sandy loam soils.

The species was first formally described by the botanist Ernst Georg Pritzel in 1904 in Engler's journal Botanische Jahrbücher für Systematik, Pflanzengeschichte und Pflanzengeographie in an article by Pritzel and Ludwig Diels entitled Fragmenta Phytographiae Australiae occidentalis.

See also
List of Baeckea species

References

Flora of Western Australia
grandibracteata
Plants described in 1904
Taxa named by Ernst Pritzel